Orlando Silvestri (born October 20, 1972, in Lille, France) is a professional footballer from R. Francs Borains.

Career

Introduction to Professional Football
After playing for JA Armentières, an amateur football club, he was hired by AS Cannes, where he played 2 seasons from 2000 to 2002.

Valenciennes FC
Silvestri started playing for the Valenciennes FC in the 2002/2003 season. During this time, he has played in 134 matches and scored 27 times. So far in the 2006/2007 season he has only had one assist and no goals.

External links 

1972 births
Living people
French people of Italian descent
French footballers
AS Cannes players
Valenciennes FC players
Association football defenders
Francs Borains players